Kaya Arıkoğlu (born November 8, 1949, in Baltimore, United States) is an American architect and urban designer.

Early life and education 
After completing his bachelor's degree in architecture at the University of Maryland, College Park, he was a student of Colin Rowe at Cornell University, finishing his Urban Design thesis on the waterfront development in south Baltimore in 1976, which was later published in Rowe's book on urbanistics.

He is a grandson of Zamir Damar Arıkoğlu, a politician in Turkey.

Works and awards 
He has won the national architecture award of Turkey in 2004 for his Mersin Chamber of Maritime Commerce building.

in 2012 he won an invite only competition for the campus design of Adana Science and Technology University.

References 

University of Maryland, College Park alumni
20th-century American architects
1949 births
Living people
American people of Turkish descent
Urban designers
Cornell University College of Architecture, Art, and Planning alumni
21st-century American architects